Alaviq (also Romanized as ‘Alavīq; also known as ‘Alavī, Alevi, and Alivi) is a village in Ozomdel-e Jonubi Rural District, in the Central District of Varzaqan County, East Azerbaijan Province, Iran. At the 2006 census, its population was 1,125, in 247 families.

References 

Towns and villages in Varzaqan County